Manon van der Meer-Masseurs (born 29 April 1974 in Rotterdam) is a former Dutch swimmer, who was specialized in freestyle.

See also 
 List of swimmers

References 

1974 births
Living people
Dutch female freestyle swimmers
Swimmers from Rotterdam
World Aquatics Championships medalists in swimming
Olympic swimmers of the Netherlands
Swimmers at the 1996 Summer Olympics
20th-century Dutch women